Teresa L. Wood is an American neuroscientist. In November 2019, Wood was elected a Fellow of the American Association for the Advancement of Science for "her research on growth factors and their signaling pathways as they pertain to stem cell differentiation, cancer, and neurodegenerative diseases."

Early life and education
Wood completed her Bachelor of Arts degree in 1978 from Carleton College and herPh.D. in 1987 from the University of California, Los Angeles.

Career
In November 2019, Wood was elected a Fellow of the American Association for the Advancement of Science for "her research on growth factors and their signaling pathways as they pertain to stem cell differentiation, cancer, and neurodegenerative diseases." Following this, she was appointed the Rena Warshow Endowed Chair in Multiple Sclerosis.

References

External links

Living people
University of California, Los Angeles alumni
Carleton College alumni
Rutgers University faculty
American women neuroscientists
American neuroscientists
Fellows of the American Association for the Advancement of Science
Year of birth missing (living people)
21st-century American women